St John's Road or St. John's Road can refer to:

St John's Road, East, a street in Dublin, Ireland.
St John's Road, West, a section of the N4 road in Dublin, Ireland.
St John's Road, Oxford, former name of St Bernard's Road.
St John's Road, London, a street in Clapham Junction, London.
St John's Road, Singapore, a street in Sembawang, Singapore.